Saland may refer to:

 Saland, Iran, a city
 Stephanie Saland, American ballet dancer and teacher
 Stephen M. Saland, former New York state senator
 Saland, Switzerland, a village